Queen Elizabeth Park Disc Golf Course, also known as Little Mountain Disc Golf Course, is an 18-hole disc golf course located in Vancouver, British Columbia, Canada. It was designed by the British Columbia Flying Disc Association in 1984. The course hosted the 1987 Western Canadian Frisbee Championships.

See also 
List of disc golf courses in British Columbia

References

External links 

 
 Course map
 DG Course Review profile
 PDGA Course Directory profile

Disc golf courses in British Columbia